Miyata Shoko (宮田 笙子, born 24 September 2004) is a Japanese artistic gymnast.  She is the 2022 World bronze medalist on the balance beam as well as the 2022 Asian Championships silver medalist on vault and floor exercise.  She represented Japan at the inaugural Junior World Championships.

Career

Junior

2018–19 
Miyata made her international debut at the 2018 International Gymnix competition in Montreal where she placed tenth in the all-around.  Later that year she competed at the 2018 Junior Asian Championships where she helped Japan finish second behind China.  Individually Miyata won bronze on vault behind Qi Qi of China and compatriot Ayumi Niiyama.

In 2019 Miyata was selected to represent Japan at the inaugural Junior World Championships alongside Hazuki Watanabe and Chiaki Hatakeda.  Together they finished eleventh as a team.  Individually Miyata finished 18th in the all-around and was the highest placing Japanese female gymnast; she was also the first reserve for the vault final.

Senior

2020 
Miyata turned senior in 2020 and made her senior international debut at the Melbourne World Cup.  She finished third on vault behind Jade Carey and Coline Devillard.  However, most other competitions were canceled or postponed due to the global COVID-19 pandemic.

2022 
Miyata competed at the 2022 Asian Championships where she helped Japan finish third as a team.  Individually she placed fourth in the all-around but won silver on vault and floor exercise behind Yeo Seo-jeong and Wu Ran respectively.  In late October Miyata made her senior World Championships debut at the 2022 World Championships in Liverpool. She contributed scores of 14.400 on vault, 13.233 on balance beam, and 13.700 on the floor exercise towards Japan's seventh place finish in the team final. She then finished eighth in the all-around final. In the balance beam final, she scored 13.533 and won the bronze medal behind teammate Hazuki Watanabe and Canadian Ellie Black.

Competitive history

References 

2004 births
Living people
Japanese female artistic gymnasts
Medalists at the World Artistic Gymnastics Championships
21st-century Japanese women